Mads Emil Møller Madsen (born 14 January 1998) is a Danish professional footballer who plays as a midfielder for Danish Superliga club AGF.

Club career

Silkeborg

Early years
Madsen discovered football on a vacation in Sweden at age 4, and shortly afterwards began playing for Gl. Rye IF in his hometown, where the team was coached by his father. At the age of 13, Madsen joined Silkeborg, the major team in the area. He was admitted to the Talent Team of Silkeborg and after graduating from elementary school, he joined Silkeborg Football College.

First team
In October 2016, Madsen signed his first professional contract with the club; a four-year deal. Alongside the new contract, he was promoted to the first-team squad in the summer 2017, and become a full-time professional. On 10 October 2016, Madsen made his debut for Silkeborg at the age of 18. Madsen started on the bench and replaced Sammy Skytte in the 87nd minut in a 1–1 draw against Lyngby. He made his first start in 0–5 defeat against AaB in the Danish Cup on 2 March 2017. Madsen made three appearances during the 2017–18 season. However, he suffered relegation with Silkeborg at the end of the season after play-offs against Esbjerg fB. In March 2019, he scored his first goal for Silkeborg and his first goal in the second-tier 1st Division in a 4–2 win over HB Køge. In the 2018–19 season, he made 28 appearances in the 1st Division, in which he scored one goal. As winners of the second tier, Madsen and Silkeborg were able to accomplish promotion back to the Danish Superliga. In February 2020, Madsen was appointed team captain of Silkeborg at the age of 22.

LASK
On 29 June 2020, Austrian Bundesliga club LASK announced his signing on a four-year contract until 2024. He made his debut on 29 August in the first round of the Austrian Cup in a 0–3 win over ASV Siegendorf. His debut in the Austrian Bundesliga came less than a month later, on 19 September in a 1–1 away draw against WSG Swarovski Tirol where he came on as a second-half substitute for James Holland. The following month, Madsen made his first start for the club in the cup match against SV Wörgl. The match ended in a 3–0 win for LASK, and Madsen played the full game. On 26 November, Madsen made his first European appearance in the group stage of the 2020–21 UEFA Europa League, playing as a starter in the 0–2 home loss to Royal Antwerp. He would also score his first goal for LASK in Europe, helping secure a 3–1 away win over Ludogorets on 10 December. LASK finished third in the group, and were knocked out of European contention. He finished the first half of the season with 15 appearances for the club and one goal, and played convincingly in all three competitions.

Slavia Prague
On 5 June 2021, Madsen signed a four-and-a-half-year deal with Czech First League club Slavia Prague. He got his debut for the club on 14 August 2021 against Mladá Boleslav.

AGF
On 1 July 2022, Madsen returned to his homeland, as he signed a deal until the end of 2026 with Danish Superliga club AGF.

International career
Madsen made two appearances for the Denmark under-18 team in May 2016. In October 2016, he played two games for the under-19 team. In September 2019, he made his debut against Hungary at under-21 level.

Career statistics

Club

References

External links
 
 Mads Emil Madsen at DBU

1998 births
Living people
Danish men's footballers
Danish expatriate men's footballers
Denmark youth international footballers
Association football midfielders
People from Skanderborg Municipality
Silkeborg IF players
LASK players
SK Slavia Prague players
Aarhus Gymnastikforening players
Danish Superliga players
Danish 1st Division players
Austrian Football Bundesliga players
Czech First League players
Danish expatriate sportspeople in Austria
Danish expatriate sportspeople in the Czech Republic
Expatriate footballers in Austria
Expatriate footballers in the Czech Republic
Denmark under-21 international footballers
Sportspeople from the Central Denmark Region